Scopula nigrocellata is a moth of the  family Geometridae. It is found on the Moluccas.

References

Moths described in 1899
nigrocellata
Moths of Indonesia